Cyprian Hedrick (born 6 October 1989) is a former Cameroonian footballer who is currently an assistant coach for FC Tulsa in the USL Championship.

Career
Hedrick played his college career at both San Jacinto College and Coastal Carolina University between 2007 and 2011. During this time he also appeared for USL PDL club Fresno Fuego from 2009 to 2011.

Hedrick was selected with the 30th overall pick in the second round of the 2012 MLS SuperDraft by Sporting Kansas City. He was with the club throughout their 2012 MLS season, but never made a first-team appearance with the club.

Hedrick signed with USL Pro club Phoenix FC in March 2013.

Hedrick signed with USL Pro club Oklahoma City Energy FC on 4 February 2014.

Hedrick joined USL side San Antonio FC ahead of their 2017 season.

Hedrick signed with USL Championship side Tulsa Roughnecks FC for the 2019 season. Hedrick served as team captain for Tulsa in 2019, playing every minute he was eligible for. Hedrick announced his retirement from professional soccer on November 11, 2020.

References

External links
 USL Pro profile

1989 births
Living people
Cameroonian footballers
Cameroonian expatriate footballers
Coastal Carolina Chanticleers men's soccer players
Fresno Fuego players
Sporting Kansas City players
Sportspeople from Harris County, Texas
Phoenix FC players
OKC Energy FC players
People from Friendswood, Texas
San Antonio FC players
FC Tulsa players
Expatriate soccer players in the United States
USL League Two players
USL Championship players
Sporting Kansas City draft picks
Association football defenders
Soccer players from Texas
High school soccer coaches in the United States
FC Tulsa coaches
USL Championship coaches